Virginia's 11th Senate district is one of 40 districts in the Senate of Virginia. It has been represented by Republican Amanda Chase since her 2015 defeat of longtime incumbent Steve Martin in the Republican primary.

Geography
District 11 is located in the southern Greater Richmond Region, including parts of Chesterfield County and all of Amelia County and the City of Colonial Heights.

Recent election results

2019

2015

2011

Historical election results
All election results below took place prior to 2011 redistricting, and thus were under different district lines.

2007

2003

1999

1995

Recent results in statewide elections

References

Virginia Senate districts
Government in Chesterfield County, Virginia
Amelia County, Virginia
Colonial Heights, Virginia